Daniel Kalinaki (born 1980) is a Ugandan journalist working with the Nation Media Group as General Manager in Uganda in charge of Editorial. He was previously the Managing Editor, Regional Content. He is married with three children.

Background and education
Kalinaki was born in 1980. For his primary education, he attended Bat Valley Primary School, and Kamuli Boys Boarding Primary and thereafter joined Busoga College Mwiri for his O'Level certificate. He did his A'levels from Makerere High School and later enrolled at Makerere University, Uganda's oldest and largest public university. He graduated with a Bachelor of Arts in Mass Communication. Later, he obtained a Master of Arts in International Journalism from the City University of London.

Career
At the age of 18, he joined the Crusader, a tri-weekly in Uganda. When it closed a year later, he started working at the Daily Monitor as a reporter, assistant radio news manager, deputy sports editor, associate editor, foreign news editor, news editor, investigations editor, and managing editor. He is a winner of the Chevening Scholarship, Sports Rookie of the Year, and the inaugural Tebere-Mudin Award for Journalistic excellence. Kalinaki's work has appeared in the Daily Monitor, The EastAfrican, the New Internationalist, Africa Confidential, the Weekly Observer, MS Magazine, and on the BBC World Service radio. He also teaches journalism part-time at Makerere University. He is a member of the International Consortium of Investigative Journalists (ICIJ).

Activism
In 2000, he co-authored with Glen Williams, Joyce Kadowe, and Noerine Kaleeba Open Secret: People Living With HIV And Aids In Uganda. This book, which was published by the UK Charity ActionAid, was the first piece of literature to trace the importance of a candid and open approach to help fight social stigma and discrimination towards HIV and AIDS.

Between 2003-2004, Kalinaki and The Monitor were taken to court by the Ugandan government to stop the publication of a controversial story alleging that government officials had unduly influenced the constitutional review process.

On 12 August 2009, Kalinaki was again questioned by the Ugandan police for about six hours over the contents of Ugandan President Yoweri Kaguta Museveni’s controversial 15 July letter on politics in the Bunyoro sub-region. Kalinaki, who swore a charge-and-caution statement under pending charges of forgery and uttering a false document, was later released on non-cash bond of UGX:10 million. That case was dismissed for lack of evidence on 7 February 2012. That was the second time in 2009 that Kalinaki had been summoned to the CID to answer questions over stories published by the Daily Monitor Publication Limited. No charges were referred in the earlier case, which followed a story that was critical of the conduct of the operation against the Lord’s Resistance Army.

Kalinaki has written a book "Kizza Besigye and Uganda's Unfinished Revolution". The book examines Kizza Besigye's "ambitions, ideals, aspirations, illusions and delusions". It also outlines how Museveni has repeated the mistakes made by predecessors Idi Amin and Milton Obote. In the book, the author suggests what Ugandans can and should do about it.

See also
 Aga Khan Fund for Economic Development
 List of newspapers in Uganda
 List of universities in Uganda
 Uganda People's Defense Force

References

External links
Daily Monitor’s Daniel Kalinaki Transferred

Ugandan journalists
HIV/AIDS in Uganda
1980 births
Living people
Alumni of City, University of London
Makerere University alumni
People educated at Busoga College
People from Eastern Region, Uganda